Lake Pepin is a lake in Le Sueur County, in the U.S. state of Minnesota.

The lake took its name from Lake Pepin on the Mississippi River.

See also
List of lakes in Minnesota

References

Lakes of Minnesota
Lakes of Le Sueur County, Minnesota